Convent of Jesus and Mary, Ambala Cantt or CJM is a girls' day-school in Ambala Cantonment, Ambala District, Haryana, India. The school was founded on 2 December 1909 at the request of Fr Julius, Vicar General of the Archdiocese of Agra, then under Most Rev Gentili, to whose Archdiocese, Ambala then belonged. The first pupil is Albert Mortimer, son of a Roman Catholic Connaught Ranger. The school's enrollment reaches 27, mostly from the families of British Army personnel. Parineeti Chopra, an Indian actress, has also studied from here. She was the Courage house caption of this  school.

Alumnae
 Parineeti Chopra

See also
Catholic Church in India

References

Girls' schools in Haryana
Ambala district
Educational institutions established in 1909
1909 establishments in India
Christian schools in Haryana